Sathi Murali was a 1941 Tamil-language film directed by Vadivelu Naicker. It starred M. K. Radha, M. R. Santhanalakshmi and T. R. Mahalingam. No print of the film is known to survive, making it a lost film.

Production 
During the late 1930s and the 1940s, there were a lot of movies with social messages such as Thyagabhoomi. Sathi Murali targeted caste-based discrimination in society. Sathi Murali was the second film for singer and actor T. R. Mahalingam who later became one of the leading stars of Tamil cinema.

Plot 

The movie was based on the story of a low-caste boy named Seenu who falls in love with a high-caste woman named Murali. After facing a lot of hardships, their love finally succeeds.

Cast 
 M. K. Radha as Seenu
 T. R. Mahalingam as Young Seenu
 M. R. Santhanalakshmi as Murali, Krishnan
 S. Varalakshmi as Young Murali
 Nagercoil Mahadevan as Naradar 
 P. G. Venkatesan as Sadhu
 T. A. Mathuram as Sathyabhama
 L. Narayana Rao
 Kali N. Rathnam
 P. S. Gnanam
 Buffoon Sankara Iyer
 Joker Ramudu

References

External links
 

1940 films
Lost Indian films
1940s Tamil-language films
Indian black-and-white films